Waldren "Frog" Joseph (September 12, 1918 – September 19, 2004) was an American jazz trombone player from New Orleans, Louisiana.

Career 
Joseph played in a variety of styles over his career but was best known as a performer of traditional New Orleans jazz, a style carried by Preservation Hall ensembles. His first job as a teenager was playing piano, double bass, and trombone on an excursion boat on Lake Pontchartrain, and he went on to tour with a range of musicians including Joe Robichaux, Sidney Desvigne, and Lee Allen. Joseph also recorded with R&B artists such as Big Joe Turner, Earl King, Smiley Lewis, and Dave Bartholomew. In the traditional vein, he recorded and toured with New Orleans bandleaders like Paul Barbarin, Louis Cottrell, Jr., and Papa French. Late in his life he was a member of the Original Camelia Band led by trumpeter Clive Wilson.

Personal life 
Joseph was the father of seven children, including sousaphone player Kirk Joseph and trombonist Charles Joseph.

References

1918 births
2004 deaths
Jazz musicians from New Orleans
American jazz trombonists
Male trombonists
20th-century American musicians
20th-century trombonists
20th-century American male musicians
American male jazz musicians
20th-century African-American musicians
21st-century African-American people